Andrey Eduardovich Klemm (Андрей Эдуардович Клемм) (born 1967) is a Russian born ballet dancer, ballet teacher, author and choreographer.

Early life and education 
Klemm was born in Moscow on April 30,1967. His father Eduard Stanislavovich Klemm was an architect and his mother Alexandra Pavlovna Klemm worked in the television industry in Moscow. 

Andrey Klemm began his ballet training at the age of nine at the Bolshoi Ballet Academy in Moscow, he moved to the school with permanent residence at the age of ten.

Among other teachers, Klemm studied for many years with Professor Alexander Bondarenko and graduated in 1985 with special distinction (Red diploma).

Career 
Upon graduating Klemm was invited by director Natalia Kasatkina to join The Moscow Classical Ballet, he was promoted to soloist and danced with this company until 1994. During this time he continued his studies with ballet master Naum Azarin-Messerer, also from 1992-1994 Klemm studied to be a ballet teacher at The Russian Institute of Theatre Arts (GITIS).

From 1994-1997 he danced at the Bonn Opera House (Oper der Stadt Bonn) with Valery Panov as director.

In 1996 Klemm began teaching master classes in major cities in the United States. Following this time in 1997, he joined the Berlin State Opera (Staatsballet, Berlin (formerly Deutsche Staatsoper Opera) as a dancer and then as a teacher and ballet master from 2001-2007. Coinciding with this time period during 2001-2006 Klemm successfully completed professorship studies at the Natalia Nesterova University of Moscow with professor Anatoly Borzov.

In 2007 Klemm was appointed ballet professor at the Opera National de Paris.

He is also a regular guest teacher at The Bolshoi Theater, Stuttgart Ballet, The Saxon State Opera in Dresden, Dusseldorf Opera House, The Vienna State Opera, The Dutch National Ballet, TheTokyo City Ballet, Tokyo Ballet, The Royal Ballet in London, as well as Tanztheater Wuppertal Pina Bausch. Klemm was also one of the ballet masters in the film “Pina” which is a 2011 German 3D documentary film about the contemporary dance choreographer Pina Bausch, when Klemm taught, Pina Bausch frequently enjoyed observing his classes.

Since 2014 Klemm has been a ballet master and judge at the International Ballet Competition Youth America Grand Prix.

In 2018 and 2019 Klemm taught at The World Ballet Festival in Tokyo Japan which was organized by NBS. He also has continued to perform occasionally with The Paris Opera Ballet as well as for choreographers such as in Mats Ek's “Bernarda's House”, with The Paris Opera Ballet Klemm performed as Monsieur Duval in John Neumeier's Lady of the Camellias, 2018-19, Pierre Lacotte's Paquita for the Bolshoi tour and several others works. 

In October 2021 Klemm performed again with the Paris Opera dancing the role of Le Marquis de la Mole in Le Rouge et le Noir of Pierre Lacotte.

Klemm has created many ballet class dvds as well as Youtube ballet classes, some of his classes are streamed on Worldballetclass. 

Throughout the course of the COVID pandemic Klemm produced 12 live workshops streamed online for  students in many different countries. In 2020 his ”Le cours d’apres” class was filmed on the Passerelle Leopold Sedar-Senghor bridge in Paris with Etoiles of Paris Opera, Hugo Marchand and Paul Marque and premiere danseuse Sylvia Saint-Martin, accompanying on the piano is Louis Lancien also from the Paris Opera.

During the pandemic, Klemm also created classes online for the Royal Ballet of London which were recorded by The Royal Ballet and used exclusively for their dancers.

In August of 2021 Klemm also created and taught classes for Le Grand Stage a classical dance workshop in Paris, continuing in  2021 he taught masterclasses for Staatsballet Berlin, LesBallets de Montecarlo, Monaco, Ballet Russo Barcelona and Stage de danse Mansle and Athens Ballet school, he continues as a ballet professor at The Paris Opera Ballet.

Repertoire: includes the ballets of Marius Petipa, Lev Ivanov, Natalia Kasatkina, Vladimir Vassiliev, Pierre Lacotte, Valerie Panov, Vamos, George Balanchine, Bejart, Rudolf Nureyev, Roland Petit, Kenneth McMillan, Alberto Alonso, Patrice Bart, William Forsythe, Vladimir Vassilyov, Vladimir Malachov, John Neumeier, and Mats Ek.

Publications 

 Classe, first published in France in 2018
Classe was also published in Russia in 2020

Videography 

 Masterclasses with Andrey Klemm, streamed on worldballetclass, 2020.
Masterclass with Andrey Klemm on DVD produced by Andrey Klemm in 2009
Little Ballerina on DVD produced in 2010 by Andrey Klemm.
 Sur Les Pointes with Etoile Isabelle Ciaravola on DVD produced by Andrey Klemm in 2013.
 Ballet class with Andrey Klemm and Amandine Albisson on DVD produced by Andrey Klemm in 2015.
 Lesson at the Opera Paquita variation Andrey Klemm and Antoine Kircher on DVD produced by Andrey Klemm in 2018
 Class at the Opera with Hannah O’Neill produced by Andrey Klemm in 2018 on DVD, streamed by worldballetclass 2020.
 Ballet Class In Paris Opera- Andrey Klemm produced by Andrey Klemm in 2019.
 Masterclass with Andrey Klemm for Rostov Theatre Ballet Company, Second Ballet festival of Olga Spesivtseva
 Andrey Klemm Lockdown Ballet Class with Chloe Reveillon for worldwide ballet class 2020.
Le cours d' apres ballet class produced by Andrey Klemm in Paris France ( 2020.)

CD’s; all produced by Andrey Klemm 

 Ballet Class Music Volume 1 Produced in Paris, France (2013)
 Ballet Class music 2  Produced in Paris France (2015)
 Ballet Class Music 3  Produced in Paris France (2017)
 Ballet Class music 4 Le cours d'après  Produced in Paris France  (2020

Choreography 
 Clara danse sur “ Casse-Noisette”, La March Prodiges 
 Clara danse sur “La Moldau”- Prodiges 3

References

Further reading 

 Filanthrope Magazine, October 4, 2021, pages 6-13
 European Dance news issue 351 (November 2018) pages 11-18
 Jennings, Amanda. “Andrey Klemm.” Dance Europe 200 (November 2015), pages 11-15
 Mihaela, “Andrey Klemm Und Sein Alltag Als Ballettmeister Der Pariser Oper.” Dance for You Magazine, October 4, 2021. Accessed October 15, 2021.

1967 births
Living people
Russian male ballet dancers
French ballet masters
Ballet teachers